The 2022–23 Danish 3rd Division will start with a group of twelve teams. After 22 rounds the group will be split in a promotion group and a relegation group. The top two teams of the promotion group will be promoted to the 2023–24 Danish 2nd Division.

Participants
AB Tårnby, Ishøj IF, SfB-Oure FA, and Holstebro were promoted from the 2021–22 Denmark Series.

Stadia and locations

League table

Promotion Group
The top 6 teams will compete for 2 spots in the 2023–24 Danish 2nd Division.
Points and goals carried over in full from the regular season.

Relegation Group
The bottom 6 teams  will compete to avoid the initial 4 relegations spots to the 2023–24 Denmark Series.
Due to Jammerbugt FC forced relegation only 3 teams are set to be relegated in the 2022-23 season.
Points and goals carried over in full from the regular season.

References

External links
  Danish FA

2022–23 in Danish football
Danish 3rd Division seasons